Clark Street is a north-south street in Chicago, Illinois that runs close to the shore of Lake Michigan from the northern city boundary with Evanston, to 2200 South in the city street numbering system. It is also seen in Riverdale beyond 127th street across the Calumet River, along with other nearby streets that ended just south of the Loop. The major length of Clark Street runs a total of 98 blocks.

History

Clark Street is named for George Rogers Clark, an American Revolutionary War soldier who captured much of the Northwest Territory from the British. Within the Chicago Loop Clark Street is one of the original streets laid out by James Thompson in his 1830 plat of Chicago. North of the Loop, from North Avenue, it roughly follows part of the path of an Indian trail called Green Bay trail (later Green Bay Road) that ran all the way to Green Bay, Wisconsin. In the 1950s Clark Street between Ohio and Armitage Streets was a substantial neighborhood barrio home to the first Puerto Ricans in Chicago. It was unofficially known as La Clark by the Puerto Ricans that lived there arriving from the steel mills of Indiana and rural migrant camps. This was primarily during the Great Migration and war effort during and after World War II. They worked at the downtown hotels, the meat packing plants and the nearby factories then located near downtown industrial areas. Many original members of the Young Lords, a former street gang that transformed into a Latino civil and human rights movement, were sons and daughters of these immigrants and grew up in La Clark.

Points of interest
From the intersection with Ashland Avenue south to Ainslie Street, Clark Street passes through the Andersonville Commercial Historic District. Graceland Cemetery is on the east side of Clark Street from Montrose Avenue to its entrance at Irving Park Road. The Metro concert hall is located at 3730 North Clark Street, 1 blocks north of Addison Street. At the intersection of Clark and Addison is Wrigley Field, home of the Chicago Cubs baseball team and also occasionally used as a concert venue. Another commercial strip on Clark Street stretches from Diversey Parkway south to Armitage Avenue. 2122 North Clark Street was the site of the Saint Valentine's Day massacre, although the building no longer stands. Further to the south, Clark Street borders Lincoln Park for 0.6 miles until it reaches North Avenue and the Chicago History Museum. The street then passes through the Near North Side, where in the River North neighborhood it passes the Rock N Roll McDonald's and the Rainforest Cafe. Then it continues over the Chicago River at the Clark Street Bridge and through the Loop, where it passes the Thompson Center and its Monument with Standing Beast. Clark Street continues between City Hall and the Daley Center and on to its termination at Cermak Road.

Transit 
The CTA 22 bus offers 24/7 service down Clark St from Howard St. to Harrison St. In addition it touches the "L" at Howard, Addison, Belmont, Clark/Division, Clark/Lake, LaSalle/Van Buren, LaSalle, & Cermak-Chinatown.

Major intersections

Gallery

References

Notes

Bibliography

Streets in Chicago
Chicago Cubs